A. esculenta may refer to:
 Alaria esculenta, a kelp species
 Aristoclesia esculenta, a synonym for Platonia insignis, a tree species native to South America in the humid forests of Brazil, Paraguay, parts of Colombia and northeast to Guyana

See also
 List of Latin and Greek words commonly used in systematic names#E